V. K. Madhavan Kutty (17 January 1934 – 1 November 2005) was a journalist from the state of Kerala, India. He was long associated with the Mathrubhumi newspaper, a Malayalam daily based out of Kozhikode. He was stationed at New Delhi as Chief of Bureau for most of his career. He was well known among the journalism circles in the capital owing to his astute professionalism and efficiency. He retired as the editor of Mathrubhumi after serving for 40 years. He was also one of the founding directors of the Malayalam satellite channel Asianet. Madhavankutty survived an aircrash which killed Union Minister Mohan Kumaramangalam and several others in 1973.

Literary works 
Apart from many in-depth articles, V K Madhavankutty has also authored several Malayalam & English novels. Some of his works are
 Asrikaram
 Ormakalute Virunnu
 Orttucollan: Malayalattinte Priyappetta Kavyasakalannal
 Oru Malayali Patrapravarttakante ormmakkurippukal
 The Unspoken Curse
 The Village before Time

He was honoured with the Sahitya Akademi Award and Padmashree (2002) by the Government of India.

References 

1934 births
2005 deaths
Malayali people
Journalists from Kerala
Writers from Palakkad
Indian newspaper editors
Indian columnists
Indian political writers
Malayalam-language writers
Government Victoria College, Palakkad alumni
Malayalam-language journalists
Recipients of the Padma Shri in literature & education
20th-century Indian journalists
Indian male journalists
Recipients of the Kerala Sahitya Akademi Award